The Eagle 68 was an open-wheel race car developed and built by Dan Gurney's All American Racers team, designed to compete in USAC IndyCar racing, starting in the 1968 season.

References 

Open wheel racing cars
American Championship racing cars